Gates of the Arctic Wilderness is a wilderness area in the U.S. state of Alaska.

When the wilderness activist Bob Marshall, for whom Bob Marshall Wilderness in Western Montana is named, explored the region in 1929 he bestowed the name "The Gates of the Arctic" on a pair of mountains near the head of the North Fork Koyukuk River (Boreal Mountain and Frigid Crags).

The wilderness is home to many animals, including grizzly bears, moose, wolves, Dall sheep, black bears, and many smaller mammals. Barren-ground caribou congregate in large herds. The rivers contain a variety of fish species, including the grayling, Arctic char and chum salmon. Eagles and other birds of prey can be seen soaring overhead waiting for unsuspecting prey.

The wilderness contains many remote glacier-carved valleys, dotted with alpine lakes. While no established trails exist, backpacking is a popular activity in the area. Some hikers carry firearms or pepper spray for protection from bears, but such attacks rarely occur. Climbers enjoy the Arrigetch Peaks and Mount Igikpak.  Although camping is unrestricted, wood is scarce and campfires are discouraged.

The wilderness encompasses six designated Wild Rivers, the Alatna River, John River, Kobuk River, the North Fork of the Koyukuk River, part of the Noatak River and the remote and seldom visited Tinayguk River.

References

External links
 Gates of the Arctic Wilderness at Wilderness.net
 ProtectedPlanet.net Gates of the Arctic Wilderness at Protected Planet

ANILCA establishments
 
Wilderness areas of Alaska